, better known by his ring name , is a Japanese professional wrestler. Togo is currently signed to New Japan Pro-Wrestling (NJPW), where he is a member of the Bullet Club stable, and its sub-group House of Torture.

Togo has spent the majority of his career as a freelancer, wrestling most notably for Michinoku Pro Wrestling and DDT Pro-Wrestling. Sato has wrestled under various ring names such as Francesco Togo, Rey Cubano and Prince Togo. Togo retired in September 2012, but returned to the ring in July 2016.

Togo has held the KO-D Openweight Championship four times, the IWGP Junior Heavyweight Tag Team Championship once with Taka Michinoku and the British Commonwealth Junior Heavyweight Championship once.

Professional wrestling career
Sato has performed for numerous Japanese promotions as well as American promotions such as Extreme Championship Wrestling (ECW), the World Wrestling Federation (WWF) and Ring of Honor (ROH).

While in Michinoku Pro Wrestling, he formed a stable called Kai En Tai DX with Taka Michinoku, Shoichi Funaki, Men's Teioh and Shiryu; Togo, along with some of his Kai En Tai teammates, was briefly a member of The Blue World Order in ECW. Throughout his career, Togo has been a part of several stables in the Japanese independent circuit: most famously the original Kai En Tai in Michinoku Pro Wrestling, but also the Legion of Violence (LOV) in Osaka Pro Wrestling, with Black Buffalo and Daioh Quallt, the Far East Connection with Gedo, Jado, Masao Orihara, and Ikuto Hidaka in various promotions; and most recently New Wrestling Aidoru (NωA) with Makoto Oishi, Mao and Shunma Katsumata in DDT.

In 2008, he debuted in the Argentinian promotion 100% Lucha, defeating Hip Hop Man. Then, he challenged Vicente Viloni for the 100% Lucha championship, winning the match. One week later, Viloni had a rematch and defeated Sato, retrieving the title 

In early 2011, Togo announced the start of his retirement tour as part of which he returned to the United States in April to take part in Chikara's 2011 King of Trios tournament, where he would team with The Great Sasuke and Jinsei Shinzaki as Team Michinoku Pro. On April 15, Team Michinoku Pro defeated Team Minnesota (1-2-3 Kid, Arik Cannon and Darin Corbin) in their first round match and followed that up by defeating Jigsaw, Manami Toyota and Mike Quackenbush in the following day's quarterfinals. On April 17, Team Michinoku Pro was eliminated from the tournament in the semifinal stage by F.I.S.T. (Chuck Taylor, Icarus and Johnny Gargano).

DDT held the Dick Togo Japanese Retirement Show at Korakuen Hall in Tokyo on June 30, 2011. In the main event Togo defeated Gedo in his final match in Japan. Afterwards he embarked on a retirement world tour, wrestling in countries such as Australia, Finland, Germany, Belgium, England, Spain, and Italy. On December 3, Togo returned to the United States for the final leg of his tour, losing to Kudo in a three-way match, which also included Masahiro Takanashi at Combat Zone Wrestling's (CZW) Indie Summit event. On December 10, Togo wrestled for Pro Wrestling Guerrilla (PWG) in Reseda, Los Angeles, losing to PWG World Champion El Generico in a non-title match. On January 1, 2012, Togo returned to Mexico, wrestling at an independent event in Ciudad Nezahualcóyotl, where he, El Alebrije and El Hijo de Dr. Wagner, Jr. defeated Golden Bull, Histeria II and Puma in a six-man tag team match. The following July, Togo took his retirement tour to Bolivia. While working in Bolivia, Togo found his way back into a DDT storyline, when Yuki Sato arrived in the country with the Ironman Heavymetalweight Championship, which he then proceeded to lose to Togo. During the following week, Togo first lost the title to local wrestler Ajayu, before regaining it from a Bolivian child and then finally losing it back to Sato. Togo finished his retirement tour on September 9, 2012, in La Paz, Bolivia. In the final match of his career, Togo teamed with Antonio Honda, Daisuke Sasaki and Yasu Urano in an eight-man elimination tag team match, where they were defeated by Ajayu, Apocalipsis, Guerrero Ayar and Halcon Dorado, with Ajayu pinning Togo for the win.

On May 29, 2015, Togo announced he was opening a wrestling school in Vietnam, named Vietnam Pro-Wrestling Academy. The school is affiliated with Vietnam's first professional wrestling promotion, New Vietnam Prowrestling (NVP), which held its first event in August 2015.

On June 5, 2016, Togo announced he was coming out of retirement. His return match took place at a DDT show on July 3.

On December 10, 2016, Togo competed in the main event of Evolve Wrestling's Evolve 74 show, defeating Chris Hero.

On July 12, 2020, at Dominion in Osaka-jo Hall, Togo joined New Japan Pro-Wrestling (NJPW), aligning himself with Bullet Club, by helping Evil capture the IWGP Heavyweight and Intercontinental Championships. He debuted eight days later in a 6-man tag team main event, as "The Spoiler". Togo, Evil and Taiji Ishimori defeated Los Ingobernables de Japón's Hiromu Takahashi, Tetsuya Naito and Bushi.

Championships and accomplishments

 100% Lucha
 Campeonato de 100% Lucha (1 time)
 Dramatic Dream Team/DDT Pro-Wrestling
Ironman Heavymetalweight Championship (4 times)
 KO-D Openweight Championship (4 times)
 KO-D Tag Team Championship (3 times) – with Nobutaka Moribe (1), Antonio Honda (1) and Taka Michinoku (1)
 El Dorado Wrestling
 Treasure Hunters Tag Team Tournament (2006) – with Shuji Kondo
 UWA World Trios Championship (1 time) – with Piza Michinoku and Antonio Honda
 Guts World Pro Wrestling
 GWC 6-Man Tag Team Championship (2 times) – with Ryan Upin and Yuki Sato (1), and Masao Orihara and Ryan Upin (1)
 Japan Indie Awards
 Best Bout Award (2011) vs. Kota Ibushi on March 27
 Michinoku Pro Wrestling
 British Commonwealth Junior Heavyweight Championship (1 time)
 Tohoku Junior Heavyweight Championship (1 time)
 Tohoku Tag Team Championship (1 time) – with The Great Sasuke
 UWA/UWF Intercontinental Tag Team Championship (1 time) – with Gedo
 Michinoku Pro Tag League (1996) – with Men's Teioh
 Futaritabi Tag Team League (2003) – with Masao Orihara
 New Japan Pro-Wrestling
 IWGP Junior Heavyweight Tag Team Championship (1 time) – with Taka Michinoku
 Osaka Pro Wrestling
 1st Year Anniversary Celebration Tag Tournament (2000) – with Black Buffalo
 Osaka Pro Wrestling Championship (1 time)
 Pro Wrestling Illustrated
 Ranked #122 of the top 500 singles wrestlers in the PWI 500 in 1999
 Ranked #399 of the 500 best singles wrestlers of the PWI Years in 2003
 Pro Wrestling Zero1-Max
 AWA World Junior Heavyweight Championship (1 time)
 NWA International Lightweight Tag Team Championship (1 time) – with Ikuto Hidaka
 NWA International Lightweight Tag Team Titles Tournament (2003) – with Ikuto Hidaka
 Universal Lucha Libre
 UWF Super Welterweight Championship (1 time)
 Tokyo Gurentai
Tokyo Intercontinental Tag Team Championship (2 times) – with Shiryu (1), Mazada (1)

References

External links 
 

Japanese male professional wrestlers
1969 births
Living people
Sportspeople from Akita Prefecture
The Blue World Order members
Bullet Club members
IWGP Junior Heavyweight Tag Team Champions
British Commonwealth Junior Heavyweight Champions
UWA World Trios Champions
20th-century professional wrestlers
21st-century professional wrestlers
Tohoku Junior Heavyweight Champions
Tohoku Tag Team Champions
Ironman Heavymetalweight Champions
KO-D Tag Team Champions
KO-D Openweight Champions